Since New Mexico's admission to the Union in January 1912, it has participated in 28 United States presidential elections. In the 1912 presidential election, Theodore Roosevelt, the Progressive Party's nominee, received the highest vote share (17.1%) ever won by a third party candidate in New Mexico. In the 1932 presidential election, Democrat Franklin D. Roosevelt won New Mexico, defeating Republican Herbert Hoover by 26.96%, which remains the largest ever margin of victory in the state's history. In the 2000 presidential election, Democrat Al Gore won New Mexico, defeating Republican George W. Bush by a margin of just 0.06% (366 votes).

Up to the 2016 presidential election, New Mexico has been a leading indicator of election trends with a success rate of 88.9%; the winner in New Mexico has won the presidency 25 out of 28 times, except in the 1976, 2000, and 2016 presidential elections. As the Electoral College winner lost the popular vote in both 2000 and 2016, New Mexico has aligned with the national popular vote in every election since 1980.

New Mexico is a signatory of the National Popular Vote Interstate Compact, an interstate compact in which signatories award all of their electoral votes to the winner of the national-level popular vote in a presidential election, even if another candidate won an individual signatory's popular vote.  it has not yet gone into force.

Presidential elections

Graph
The following graph shows the margin of victory of the Democratic and Republican Parties in the 28 presidential elections New Mexico participated. Value above the origin point on the Y-axis indicated Democratic Party's margin of victory; values below the origin point indicates Republican Party's margin of victory.

See also
 Elections in New Mexico
 List of United States presidential election results by state

Notes

References

Works cited